Australia – Marshall Islands are bilateral relations between Australia and the Marshall Islands. The Marshall Islands are located approximately halfway between Australia and Hawaii. The two countries are members of the Pacific Islands Forum.

History
Australia was the second country, after the United States, to establish diplomatic relations with the Marshall Islands following its independence. From 1989 to 2021 Australia was accredited to the Marshall Islands from its embassy in Pohnpei, Micronesia. Australia opened a resident embassy in the Marshall Islands' capital Majuro in May 2021. The Marshall Islands is accredited to Australia from its embassy in Suva, Fiji.

Aid
Australia is a donor of aid to the Marshall Islands and the North Pacific subregion of Oceania. Australia's aid program in the North Pacific is focused on the Federated States of Micronesia (FSM), the Republic of Palau and the Marshall Islands. In the Marshall Islands it has helped in securing water supplies and sanitation services, and improving social and economic opportunities for women and girls. Between 2012 and 2016, the Australian government claims to have educated 8,500 children in the Marshall Islands and Micronesia about climate change mitigation and disaster risk management. The Australian government provided an estimated $8.4 million in total Official Development Assistance (ODA) to the North Pacific in 2019-20.

In 2021, the governments of Australia and Japan decided to fund two major law enforcement developments in the Marshall Islands.

See also
 Foreign relations of the Marshall Islands
 Foreign relations of Australia

References 

Marshall Islands
Australia